Thomas P. O'Reilly (6 August 1915 – 12 February 1995) was an Irish Gaelic footballer, politician and farmer from County Cavan. He was born at the Derries Upper, Killeshandra, County Cavan. His father was John O'Reilly, who played as goalkeeper on the Cavan county team and his mother was Sarah Anne.

Gaelic footballer
O'Reilly played for Cornafean and the Cavan county team from the early 1930s until the mid-1940s, and was acclaimed as one of the country’s greatest midfielders for much of that period.  His footballing ability and his large build earned him the name "Big Tom".  His brother John Joe O'Reilly was also a noted Cavan footballer.

He first played for Cornafean on the club's junior team which progressed to the Junior Championship semi-final in 1931. Although only sixteen years old, he quickly made a big impression and was at centrefield a year later on the senior team which defeated Bailieboro in the county final. He continued to star as a midfielder for Cornafean until he retired in 1948. He won a total of nine Cavan Senior Football Championship medals and captained Cornafean on seven of those occasions.

However, it was to be his contribution to the Cavan county team that earned him enduring national renown. A star for the county minors and juniors in 1932, he made his debut for the Cavan seniors a year later, and played a key role at midfield when Cavan defeated Galway in the 1933 All-Ireland Senior Football Championship Final. He won a second All Ireland medal two years later and played on the losing Cavan teams in the 1937, 1943 and 1945 finals. He captained the county side from 1937 to 1945 and was still on the Cavan panel when they won the famous 1947 All-Ireland Senior Football Championship Final at the Polo Grounds in New York. He was also a regular on the Ulster teams for the Railway Cup in 1940s.

Politics
O'Reilly was elected to Dáil Éireann as an independent Teachta Dála (TD) for the Cavan constituency at the 1944 general election. He stood as a Fine Gael candidate at the 1948 general election, but was defeated by another independent candidate, and did not stand for the Dáil again.

In later life, he was a successful businessman.

References

1915 births
1995 deaths
Cavan inter-county Gaelic footballers
Cornafean Gaelic footballers
Fine Gael politicians
Independent TDs
Irish farmers
Irish sportsperson-politicians
Members of the 12th Dáil
Politicians from County Cavan